Kieran Sells (born March 30, 1984) is a production assistant on ABC's Jimmy Kimmel Live! Sells, who was born in Toronto, Ontario, Canada, began his show business career by appearing as a child extra in many movies, including John Carpenter's 1995 cult classic, In the Mouth of Madness. He attended Temple University in Philadelphia, Pennsylvania.

Filmography

References

External links

People from Toronto
Living people
1984 births